Lignyodina is a subtribe of leguminous seed weevils in the family of beetles known as Curculionidae. There are at least 2 genera and about 15 described species in Lignyodina.

Genera
These two genera belong to the subtribe Lignyodina:
 Lignyodes Dejean, 1835 i c g b (ash seed weevils)
 Plocetes LeConte, 1876 i c g b
Data sources: i = ITIS, c = Catalogue of Life, g = GBIF, b = Bugguide.net

References

Further reading

External links

 

Curculioninae